West Stayton is an unincorporated community in Marion County, Oregon, United States. It is located four miles west of Stayton, and five miles south of Aumsville.

The ZIP Code is 97325. It is part of the Salem Metropolitan Statistical Area.

Salem, Oregon metropolitan area
Unincorporated communities in Marion County, Oregon
Unincorporated communities in Oregon